George William Erving (1769July 22, 1850) was an American diplomat from colonial Boston.

He was U.S. Consul in London, from 1801 to 1804. He was Chargé d'Affaires of the United States in Madrid from 1804 to 1809, Special Negotiator to Copenhagen in 1811, and U.S. Minister to Spain, from 1814 to 1819. He was United States Chargé d'Affaires to the Ottoman Empire, before 1831.  Erving was elected a member of the American Antiquarian Society in 1834.

His papers are held at Yale University.

References

External links

"George W. Erving (1769-1850), (painting)". SIRIS

1769 births
1850 deaths
People from colonial Boston
Alumni of the University of Oxford
19th-century American diplomats
Ambassadors of the United States to Spain
Members of the American Antiquarian Society